Dorsey Lee Riddlemoser (March 25, 1875 – May 11, 1954) was an American professional baseball player who played in one game for the Washington Senators during the  season.

He was born in Frederick, Maryland and died there at the age of 78.

References

External links

Major League Baseball pitchers
Baseball players from Maryland
Washington Senators (1891–1899) players
Sportspeople from Frederick, Maryland
1875 births
1954 deaths
19th-century baseball players
Williamsport Demorest Bicycle Boys players
Allentown Peanuts players
Meriden Silverites players